Hemidactylus asirensis is a species of gecko. It is endemic to Saudi Arabia.

References

Hemidactylus
Reptiles described in 2016
Reptiles of the Middle East
Endemic fauna of Saudi Arabia